Shaqaqi may refer to:

 Shaqaqi-ye Anzar
 Shaqaqi-ye Chavarzaq
 Shaqaqi-ye Jezla